AA 2319 (UNS A92319) is an aluminium alloy principally containing copper (5.8–6.8%) as an alloying element. It also contains ≤0.20% silicon, ≤0.30% iron, 0.20–0.40% manganese, ≤0.02% magnesium, ≤0.10% zinc, 0.10–0.20% titanium, 0.05–0.15% vanadium, 0.10–0.25% zirconium, ≤0.0003% beryllium (in arc welding electrodes) and up to 0.15% trace elements. This alloy was first registered in 1958, in the United States.

This alloy is typically used as an arc welding electrode or filler material for use with AA 2219 workpieces.

References

Aluminium alloys
Aluminium–copper alloys